Chromodoris aspersa is a species of colourful sea slug, a dorid nudibranch, a marine gastropod mollusc in the family Chromodorididae.

Distribution

This chromodorid nudibranch was first described from Kawahe or Vincennes Island, Tuamotus. It is a widespread species in the Indo-Pacific tropical region.

Description
Chromodoris aspersa has a white mantle covered with small rounded purple spots which have a diffuse edge. The mantle rim has a marginal band of orange-yellow. The gills and rhinophores are marked with orange-yellow. This species has been revealed to be a species complex and work is needed to elucidate the species.

References

External links
 

Chromodorididae
Gastropods described in 1852